Dimítrios Régas (born 12 September 1986), in Lesbos (Mytilini) island, is a Greek sprint athlete.

He won the bronze medal (46.79 sec) in the 400 metres at 2005 European Athletics Junior Championships. At the age of 20, Regas finished eighth (46.23 sec) in the 400 metres final at the 2006 European Athletics Championships in Gothenburg, having set a PB of 45.60 sec at the semifinals. The same year he was third at the 2006 IAAF World Cup held at Athens Olympic Stadium with his personal best of 45.11 seconds, which still holds as a Greek national record.

He was a member of Panellinios S.C and was coached by former Greek champion Georgios Panagiotopoulos. 
Height: 1.76, Weight: 70 kg,

Regas was suspended from competition for using the banned steroid "Methyltrienolone" in July 2008 in his A sample.

References

1986 births
Greek male sprinters
Living people
Doping cases in athletics
Greek sportspeople in doping cases
People from Mytilene
Sportspeople from the North Aegean
21st-century Greek people